HD 42936 (DMPP-3) is a star located in the southern circumpolar constellation Mensa. With an apparent magnitude of 9.1, it is too faint to be detected with the naked eye but can be seen with a telescope.

HD 42936 is an early K-type star with the blended luminosity class of a main sequence star and a subgiant. At present it has 87% the mass of the Sun and 91% the radius of the Sun. The object shines at 51% the luminosity of the Sun from its photosphere at an effective temperature of 5,138 K, which gives it an orangish yellow glow. HD 42936 has iron abundance 151% that of the Sun, meaning it is metal enriched despite an age of 10.9 billion years.

Planetary system 
In 2019, an  analysis carried out by a team of astronomers led by astronomer John R. Barnes of the Dispersed Matter Planet Project (DMPP) confirmed the existence of a super-Earth in orbit around DMPP-3

See also 
 List of extrasolar planets

References 

042936
28941
K-type main-sequence stars
HD, 042936
Mensa (constellation)
Planetary systems with one confirmed planet